The St. George's Colts is a Bermudian football team based in St. George's, Bermuda. The club presently competes in the Bermudian Premier Division, the top tier of football in Bermuda.

They were promoted to the top division in 2020, earning promotion from the Bermuda First Division.

References

Football clubs in Bermuda
St. George's, Bermuda